The Gates of Paradise is a studio album by progressive rock guitarist Robert Fripp. This album is more ambient than progressive rock, and continues Fripp's tendency towards soundscape explorations in his music. The album received generally positive reviews from both professional reviewers  and fan reviews. The album consists of two tracks, each broken into two parts. "The Outer Darkness" runs for nearly 34 minutes, and "Gates of Paradise" runs for over 24 minutes.

Track listing
 "The Outer Darkness: I. The Outer Darkness / II. Perimeter I / III. Perimeter II / IV. Wailing I / V. Perimeter III / VI. Wailing II / VII. Perimeter IV / VIII. Wailing III / IX. Black Light / X. A Wailing and Gnashing of Teeth" – 23:38
 "The Gates of Paradise: I. Abandonment to Divine Providence / II. Pie Jesu" – 13:56
 "The Outer Darkness: XI. In Fear and Trembling of the Lord" – 10:17
 "The Gates of Paradise: III. Sometimes God Hides / IV. Acceptance" – 11:41
Total time: 59:32

Personnel
 Robert Fripp – guitar and soundscapes 
 David Singleton – digital compositor

Notes

1998 albums
Ambient albums by English artists
King Crimson
Robert Fripp albums
Discipline Global Mobile albums